Porro  is a surname. Notable people with the name include:

Arturo Porro (athlete) (1890 - 1967), Italian athlete
Arturo Porro (sport shooter) (born 1919), Uruguayan sports shooter
Benedetta Bianchi Porro (1936–1964), Italian Roman Catholic
Chiara Porro, Australian diplomat
Eduardo Porro (1842–1902), Italian obstetrician
Enrico Porro (1885–1967), Italian wrestler
Francisco Bartolomé Porró y Reinado, O.F.M. (1739–1814), Spanish prelate of the Roman Catholic Church
Girolamo Porro (born 1520), Italian engraver
Blessed Giovannangelo Porro (1451-1505), Italian Roman Catholic priest and hermit 
Maria Corina Porro Martinez (born 1953), Spanish politician
Ignazio Porro (1801–1875), Italian inventor of optical instruments
Count Luigi Renato Porro-Lambertenghi (1780-1860) Italian nationalist, businessman, and politician
Pedro Porro (born 1999), Spanish footballer
Pierre Jean Porro (1750–1831), French guitarist, composer and music publisher
Ricardo Porro (1925–2014), Cuban architect

See also 
 Porri (surname)
 Porro (disambiguation)

Italian-language surnames